Parma Associazione Calcio eased through the infamous second season following promotion, and ended it in style by winning Coppa Italia, the club's first ever significant silverware. That also qualified the club for the 1992–93 UEFA Cup Winners' Cup, a tournament it went on to win. Its inaugural European adventure was in the autumn of 1991, when it lost to CSKA Sofia of Bulgaria in the first round of the UEFA Cup. It did not improve on 1991's famous fifth place in Serie A as rookies, but only slipped one position, with the defence playing as well as ever. The lack of a top scorer cost Parma the chance to fight Torino for third in the championship.

Players

Goalkeepers
  Cláudio Taffarel
  Marco Ballotta

Defenders
  Antonio Benarrivo
  Luigi Apolloni
  Alberto Di Chiara
  Lorenzo Minotti
  Stefano Nava
  Georges Grün
  Cornelio Donati
  Giovanni Bia
  Antonio Sconziano
  Sebastiano Siviglia

Midfielders
  Daniele Zoratto
  Stefano Cuoghi
  Tarcisio Catanese
  Ivo Pulga
  Tomas Brolin
  Marco Osio
  Diego Ficarra

Forwards
  Alessandro Melli
  Massimo Agostini
  Mario Lemme

Competitions

Serie A

League table

Matches

Coppa Italia

Second round

Round of 16

Quarter-finals

Semi-final

Final

UEFA Cup

First round

Statistics

Goalscorers
  Alessandro Melli 6
  Tomas Brolin 4
  Massimo Agostini 4
  Georges Grün 4
  Lorenzo Minotti 4

References

Parma Calcio 1913 seasons
Parma